"Pope" is a recitation for unaccompanied voice, composed by Juan María Solare. It is based on text by Alfred Edward Housman.  The 17-minute work was composed in Cologne, Germany and Saint-Germain des Angles in Évreux, France, between July 9 and July 27, 1996. It is five pages in length.

Performance history
January 28, 1998: Ligia Liberatori in Cologne, in "Die Gewölbe" (avant-premiere)
May 27, 1998: Ligia Liberatori in Cologne in the "Freie Kammerspiele Köln" official first performance
January 21, 1999: Marc Aisenbrey at Musikhochschule, Stuttgart
February 18, 1999: Julius Pfeifer at Musikhochschule, Stuttgart
April 24, 1999: Ligia Liberatori at Theatermesse, Dresden
June 29, 1999: Ligia Liberatori at "Cour des Capucins" Festival, Luxembourg
July 23, 24, 25 1999: Ligia Liberatori in Beaufort, Luxembourg
July 17, 2001: Ligia Liberatori in Aula Magna at the University in Cologne

References

1996 songs
Compositions by Juan María Solare